Maria Sur (born 31 December 2004) is a Ukrainian singer who lives and works in Sweden. She is best known for participating in Melodifestivalen 2023 with her song "Never Give Up".

Life and career
Sur was born in Zaporizhzhia. In 2022, Maria Sur participated in the twelfth season of Holos Krainy, the Ukrainian version of The Voice. Following the 2022 Russian invasion of Ukraine, Sur and her mother fled Ukraine, and settled in Sweden. Sur soon came into contact with singer Sarah Dawn Finer, which led to Sur getting to perform at a charity gala in solidarity with Ukraine, in Avicii Arena, Stockholm, where she performed the Destiny's Child song "Survivor". She later signed a record deal with Warner Music Sweden. 

Sur participated in Melodifestivalen 2023 with the song "Never Give Up", finishing ninth in the final. During the summer of 2023, Sur will be participating in the Diggiloo tour around Sweden.

Discography

Singles

References

External links 

 
 
 
 
 
 
 
 
 
 

2004 births
21st-century Ukrainian women singers
Living people
Ukrainian pop singers
Ukrainian refugees
Ukrainian expatriates in Sweden
People from Zaporizhzhia
Melodifestivalen contestants of 2023